

Podda (died c. 754) was a medieval Bishop of Hereford.

Podda was consecrated in 741 and died between 747 and 758.

Citations

References

External links
 

Bishops of Hereford
8th-century English bishops
8th-century deaths
Year of birth unknown